Godric of Finchale (or St Goderic) ( – 21 May 1170) was an English hermit, merchant and popular medieval saint, although he was never formally canonised. He was born in Walpole in Norfolk and died in Finchale in County Durham.

Life

Godric's life was recorded by a contemporary of his, a monk named Reginald of Durham. Several other hagiographies are also extant. According to these accounts, Godric, who began from humble beginnings as the son of Ailward and Edwenna, "both of slender rank and wealth, but abundant in righteousness and virtue". He began as a peddler and became an entrepreneur. "[H]e was wont to wander with small wares around the villages and farmsteads of his own neighborhood; but, in process of time, he gradually associated himself by compact with city merchants."

Then he was a ship's captain and part owner of two ships, one of which may have conveyed Baldwin I of Jerusalem to Jaffa in 1102. After many pilgrimages around the Mediterranean, Godric found himself off the Farne Islands near Lindisfarne and there was inspired to change his life.

Godric returned to England and lived at Wolsingham with an elderly hermit named Aelric (†1107) for two years. Upon Aelric's death, Godric made one last pilgrimage to Jerusalem, and then returned home where he convinced Ranulf Flambard, the Bishop of Durham, to grant him a place to live as a hermit at Finchale, by the River Wear. He had previously served as doorkeeper, the lowest of the minor orders, at the hospital church of nearby St Giles Hospital in Durham. At Finchale he cleared forests to build a wooden oratory dedicated to the Virgin Mary; later he constructed a stone chapel dedicated to St John the Baptist.

He is recorded to have lived at Finchale for the final sixty years of his life, occasionally meeting with visitors approved by the local prior. As the years passed, his reputation grew, and Thomas Becket and Pope Alexander III both reportedly sought Godric's advice as a wise and holy man.

Reginald describes Godric's physical attributes:

St Godric is perhaps best remembered for his kindness toward animals, and many stories recall his protection of the creatures who lived near his forest home. According to one of these, he hid a stag from pursuing hunters; according to another, he even allowed snakes to warm themselves by his fire. Godric lived on a diet of herbs, wild honey, acorns, crab-apples and nuts. He slept on the bare ground.

Reginald of Durham recorded four songs of St Godric's: they are the oldest songs in English for which the original musical settings survive. Reginald describes the circumstances in which Godric learnt the first song. In a vision the Virgin Mary appeared to Godric with at her side "two maidens of surpassing beauty clad in shining white raiments." They pledged to come to his aid in times of need; and the Virgin herself taught Godric a song of consolation to overcome grief or temptation (Saintë Marië Virginë).

The novel Godric (1981) by Frederick Buechner is a fictional retelling of his life and travels. It was a finalist for a Pulitzer Prize.

A tune named for him by its composer, John Bacchus Dykes, appears in dozens of hymnals.

See also
 Saint Godric, patron saint archive

Notes

References

Bibliography
Reginald of Durham, "Life of St. Godric", in G. G. Coulton, ed. Social Life in Britain from the Conquest to the Reformation (p. 415) Cambridge: Cambridge University Press, 1918. – digital copy
Frederick Buechner, Godric, 1981, a historical novel.
Entry for "Godric", first edition of the Dictionary of National Biography.
Victoria M. Tudor, "Reginald of Durham and St. Godric of Finchale: a study of a twelfth-century hagiographer and his subject", Reading PhD thesis, 1979.
Victoria M. Tudor, "Reginald of Durham and Saint Godric of Finchale: learning and religion on a personal level", Studies in Church History, 17, 1981.
 Susan J. Ridyard, "Functions of a Twelfth-Century Recluse Revisited: The Case of Godric of Finchale", in Belief and Culture in the Middle Ages: Studies Presented to Henry Mayr-Harting. Eds. Henry Mayr-Harting, Henrietta Leyser and Richard Gameson (Oxford, OUP, 2001), pp.
 Francis Rice, rector of St Godrics "The Hermit of Finchale: Life of Saint Godric" Pentland Press

External links
Medieval SourceBook: Reginald of Durham, Life of Saint Godric (12th Cent), excerpts.
The Hermit in Lore: Frederick Buechner's Godric.
Santë Marië Virginë performed by the early music group La Reverdie

People from Walpole, Norfolk
English centenarians
Men centenarians
12th-century Christian saints
1060s births
1070s births
1170 deaths
Medieval English saints
English hermits
English male classical composers
11th-century composers
12th-century composers
Medieval male composers